In mathematical analysis, the Young's inequality for integral operators, is a bound on the  operator norm of an integral operator in terms of  norms of the kernel itself.

Statement

If 
  for all 
and 
   for all 
then

Particular cases

Convolution kernel 

See also
Young's inequality for products

Notes

Inequalities